Bernhard Ludwig Buchbinder (7 July or 20 September 1849 – 24 June 1922), pseudonym Gustav Klinger, was an Austro-Hungarian actor, journalist and writer. His best-known operetta libretto remains Die Försterchristl.

Career 
Buchbinder was born in Budapest, then part of the Austrian Empire. His date of birth is, according to different sources, 7 July or 20 September 1849. Initially he was an actor, later he was the publisher of the humorous fiction weekly Das kleine Journal in Budapest. Beside his journalistic activity Buchbinder wrote novels, folk plays and especially operetta libretti in Viennese style.

Buchbinder died in Vienna.

Works 
 Der Satan vom Neugebäude. Novel (1884)
 Der Sänger von Palermo. 3 acts operette (1888)
 Die Teufelsglocke. 3 acts opera (1891)
 Eine Wiener Theaterprinzessin. Novel (1894)
 Fräulein Hexe. 3 acts operette (together with Alfred Maria Willner)
 Die Flüchtlinge. 3 acts Opéra comique
 Die Küchen Comtesse. Farce with singing in 3 acts
 Die Dame vom Zirkus. Operette
 Der Kibitz. Farce with singing in 3 acts
 Der Schmetterling. 3 acts operette (together with Alfred Maria Willner), 1896
 Die Göttin der Vernunft. Operette (together with Alfred Maria Willner), 1897 Music by Johann Strauss II.
 Leute von Heute. farce with singing in 3 acts (1899) (music by Joseph Hellmesberger Jr.)
 Er und seine Schwester. Farce with singing in 4 scenes (1902) (music by Rudolf Raimann)
 Der Musikant und sein Weib. Folk play with song in 4 acts (1903)
 Das Wäschermädel. Operette (1905)
 Der Schusterbub. Farce with singing in 4 scenes (1906)
 Die Försterchristl. 3 acts operette (1907)
 Paula macht alles. Operetten-Posse in 4 Akten (1909)
 Das Musikantenmädel. 3 acts operette (1910)
 Das neue Mädchen. 3 acts vaudeville (1911)
 Die Frau Gretl. Farce with singing in 3 acts (1911)
 Die Marie-Gustl. Operette (1912)
 Die Wundermühle. Possenspiel in 3 acts (1914)
 Graf Habenichts. 3 acts operette (around 1917)
 Jungfer Sonnenschein. Operette (1918)
 Zum goldenen Segen. Folk play with song in 3 acts (1921)

Bibliography 
 Felix Czeike (editor): Buchbinder Bernhard Ludwig. In: Historisches Lexikon Wien. Band 1, Kremayr & Scheriau, Wien 1992, .
 
 Buchbinder, Bernhard. In . Volume 4: Brech–Carle. Hrsg. vom Archiv Bibliographia Judaica. Saur, München 1996, .

References

External links 
 Jewish Encyclopedia: "Buchbinder, Bernhard" by Isidore Singer & Frederick Haneman (1906).
 
 

1849 births
1922 deaths
Male actors from Budapest
19th-century Austrian male writers
20th-century Austrian male writers
Austrian librettists